Men's discus throw events for athletes with cerebral palsy were held at the 2004 Summer Paralympics in the Athens Olympic Stadium. Events were held in six disability classes, F32 being held jointly with F51 wheelchair athletes.

F32/51

F33-34

The F33-34 event was won by Siamak Salehfarajzadeh, representing .

20 Sept. 2004, 18:45

F35

The F35 event was won by Yan Feng, representing .

24 Sept. 2004, 17:00

F36

The F36 event was won by Milan Kubala, representing .

24 Sept. 2004, 21:00

F37

The F37 event was won by Tomasz Blatkiewicz, representing .

21 Sept. 2004, 17:00

F38

The F38 event was won by Oleksandr Doroshenko, representing .

22 Sept. 2004, 09:00

References

M